The King of Laughter is a 2021 Italian-Spanish biographical drama film directed by Mario Martone about actor and playwright Eduardo Scarpetta's legal battle against Gabriele D'Annunzio over his parody of the latter's The Daughter of Iorio (1904). Toni Servillo stars as Scarpetta.

The film was selected to compete for the Golden Lion at the 78th Venice International Film Festival.

Cast

Reception
On the review aggregator website Rotten Tomatoes, 80% of 5 critics gave the film a positive review.
Reviewing the film for Variety at the Venice Film Festival, Guy Lodge wrote, "Martone’s film certainly appears to channel the spirit of Scarpetta, though its 18-course tribute banquet doesn’t leave you particularly hungry to investigate further."

References

External links
 

2021 films
2021 drama films
Biographical films about actors
Courtroom films
Films about playwrights
Films about theatre
Films directed by Mario Martone
Films set in Naples
Films set in the 1900s
Films set in the 1910s
Films set in the 1920s
Films shot in Naples
Italian biographical drama films
Spanish biographical drama films
Cultural depictions of Gabriele D'Annunzio
2020s Italian films
2020s Spanish films